The Easter Bilby is an Australian alternative to the Easter Bunny.

Origin 
 

Bilbies are native Australian marsupials that are endangered. To raise money and increase awareness of conservation efforts, bilby-shaped chocolates and related merchandise are sold within many stores throughout Australia as an alternative to Easter bunnies.

The first documented use of the Easter Bilby concept was in March 1968 when a 9-year-old girl Rose-Marie Dusting, wrote a story, "Billy The Aussie Easter Bilby," which she published as a book 11 years later.  The story helped catalyse the public's interest in saving the bilby.
In 1991, Nicholas Newland from the 'Foundation for Rabbit-Free Australia' also developed the idea of the Easter Bilby to raise awareness about the environmental damage that feral rabbits cause and to replace the Easter bunny with true native wildlife.

The first Chocolate Easter Bilbies were sold at the Warrawong Sanctuary when it was owned by John Wamsley.

History 
Chocolate manufacturers that donate towards bilby conservation include Pink Lady and Haigh's Chocolates. In 2014, Pink Lady donated 30 cents from every large bilby sale and $1 from every 10 pack. Parent company Fyna Foods manufactures chocolate bilbies as well as other iconic Australian fauna in their Australian Bush Friends Easter chocolate. 20 cents from every Bush Friends collection is donated to the Save the Bilby Fund. 2015 saw these chocolates raise over $33,000 to the fund.

For three years prior to 2018, Cadbury donated $10,000 per year to the Save the Bilby Fund, although they were not an official partner.  , the Cadbury bilbies were discontinued, resulting in major supermarkets Coles and Woolworths not stocking any chocolate bilbies.

Darrell Lea began selling chocolate bilbies in 1999.  As of 2009, sales of Darrell Lea's bilbies were about the same as their sales of bunnies.  From 1999 to 2008, Darrell Lea raised $300,000 towards the Save the Bilby Fund.  Prior to their store closures in 2012, Darrell Lea donated approximately $60,000 per year to the Save the Bilby Fund from the sales of the Darrell Lea chocolate bilbies.

Australian children's book author and illustrator Irena Sibley produced three Easter Bilby books between 1994 and 2000 including the best selling The Bilbies' First Easter,  published by Silver Gum Press in 1994.

In 1993, Australian children's author Jeni Bright wrote the story of "Burra Nimu, the Easter Bilby".  It tells how Burra, a shy but brave little bilby, decides to save the land from the rabbits and foxes who are ruining it.  Burra and his family and friends gather together for a wonderful time painting Easter eggs to give to the children and ask for their help.  But before they can set off on their journey to the children, they must outwit the rabbit army. As well as the story of the Easter Bilby, the not-for-profit website 'Burra Nimu, the Easter Bilby' contains factual information about bilbies and other endangered Australian species.  It is illustrated by Australian illustrator Janet Selby.

In 2003, funds from the sale of chocolate bilbies were used to build a 20 km (10 mile) long predator-proof fence in Currawinya National Park.

, consumers were urged to buy chocolate bilbies with a green tag, signifying that the sale raises funds for the bilby. Nevertheless, research has shown that throughout the last decade the concept of the Easter bilby has seen decreased interest in Australia, as shown by online searches and mentions in major newspapers. This, coupled with changes in the Australian chocolate industry, including the decision of Cadbury and Darrell Lea to stop making chocolate bilbies, has meant that the Easter bilby is increasingly a niche product, removed from mainstream Australian culture.
In 2019, Cadbury announced it will no longer make the chocolate bilbies, and no major supermarkets carried them.

See also 
Rabbits in Australia

References

1968 introductions
Holiday characters
Fictional marsupials
Australian folklore
Peramelemorphs
Australian inventions
Easter Bunny
Australian confectionery